Machine – mechanical system that provides the useful application of power to achieve movement.  A machine consists of a power source, or engine, and a mechanism or transmission for the controlled use of this power.  The combination of force and movement, known as power, is an important characteristic of a machine.

Essence of machines 

 Applied mechanics
 Machining, Machinist
 Mechanical engineering
 Mechanics
 Mechanism (engineering)

History of machines 

 Antikythera mechanism
 Automatic lathe
 Enigma machine
 Early flying machines
 History of the bicycle
 History of computing hardware
 History of the sewing machine
 History of perpetual motion machines
 Industrial revolution
 History of mechanical engineering
 Paper machine
 Simple machine
 Tabulating machine
 Threshing machine
 Vending machine
 Washing machine

Machine theory 
The mathematical tools for the analysis of movement in machines:
 Burmester theory
 Clifford algebra
 Dual quaternion
 Euler's rotation theorem
 Gear ratio
 Ideal machine
 Instantaneous center of rotation
 Mechanical advantage
 Power (physics)
 Rotation matrix
 Screw axis
 Screw theory
 Virtual work
 Work (physics)

Machine elements 
Movement in a machine is controlled by mechanism elements that the shape forces and movement and structural elements that support these mechanisms.

Mechanism elements 
 Block and tackle
 Brake
 Clutch
 Cam
 Cam follower
 Chain drive
 Continuously variable transmission
 Drive shaft
 Epicyclic gearing
 Four-bar linkage
 Gear
 Gear train
 Geneva drive
 Kinematic coupling
 Linkage (mechanical)
 Mechanism (engineering)
 Six-bar linkage
 Sprocket
 Transmission (mechanics)
 Universal joint

Structural elements 
 Frame
 Fasteners
 Bearings
  Springs
 Lubricants
  Seals
 Clevis pin, Cotter pin, Spring pin, Taper pin
  Splines
 Keys

Types of machines and automated devices 

 Clock
 Atomic clock
 Watch
 Pendulum clock
 Quartz clock
 Compressors and pumps 
 Archimedes' screw
 Eductor-jet pump
 Hydraulic ram
 Pump
 Trompe
 Vacuum pump
  Conveyor systems
 Conveyor belt
 Treadmill
 Conveyor transport
 Escalator
 Moving walkway
 Electronic machines
 Computing machines 
 Calculator
 Computer
 Electronic components
 Transistor
 Diode
 Capacitor
 Resistor
 Inductor
 Telecommunications
 Telephone system
  Engines
 Heat engine: external combustion 
 Steam engine
 Stirling engine
  Heat engine: internal combustion
 Reciprocating engine
 Wankel engine
 Jet engine
 Rocket
  Turbine engines
 Gas turbine, Jet engine
 Steam turbine
 Water turbine
 Wind generator
 Windmill (Air turbine)
  Linkages 
 Pantograph
 Peaucellier–Lipkin
  Power tools
 Machine tools
 Broaching machine
 Drill press
 Gear shaper
 Hobbing machine
 Hone
 Lathe
 Milling machine
 Shaper
 Planer
 Stewart platform mills
 Grinders
 Hand-held power tools
 Belt sander
 Ceramic tile cutter tile saw
 Chainsaw
 Circular saw
 Concrete saw
 Diamond blade
 Diamond tools
 Disc sander
 Drill
 Heat gun
 Impact wrench
 Jigsaw
 Nail gun
 Powder-actuated tools
 Random orbital sander
 Rotary tool (such as Dremel)
 Sander
 Wood router
 Trimmer
 Other
 Air compressor
 Bandsaw
 Belt sander
 Biscuit joiner
 Cold metal-cutting saw
 Crusher
 Disc sander
 Jointer
 Radial arm saw
 Random orbital sander
 Sander
 Steel cut-off saw
 Table saw
 Thickness planer
 Wood router
 grinder
  Robotics
 Robot
 Android
 Animatronic
 Automaton
 ASIMO
 Industrial robot
 Robotic arm
 Simple machine – There are only 3 fundamental machines, with 4 variations, for a total of 7 simple machines
 Lever
 Inclined Plane
 Screw – combination of a wheel and an inclined plane
 Wedge
 Wheel
 Pulley
 Gear – combination of a wheel and a lever
 Vehicles
 Man powered vehicles
 Bicycle
 Pedalo
 Powered vehicles
 Car
 Train
 Airplane
 Ship
 Miscellaneous
 Vending machine
 Wind tunnel

General machine-related concepts 
 Automation
 Fabrication
 Factory
 Machine shop
 Manufacturing
 Production line
 Tools

Machine operations 
 Cutting
 Deformation
 Drilling
 Edge jointing
 Knurling
 Molding
 Sanding

Mechanical components 
 Gear
 Rope
 Spring
 Wheel
 Axle
 Bearings
 Belts
 Seals
 Roller chains
 Link chains
 Rack and pinion
 Fastener
 Key

Airfoil 

Airfoil
 Sail
 Wing
 Rudder
 Flap
 Propeller

Inventors and designers of machines 
 Archimedes
 Banū Mūsā
 Joseph Marie Jacquard
 Jerome H. Lemelson
 Leonardo da Vinci
 Thomas Edison
 James Watt

Machine lists 
 List of early flying machines
 Outline of robotics

See also 
 Outline of robotics
 Outline of automation
 Engineering
 Technology

External links 

 Reuleaux Collection of Mechanisms and Machines at Cornell University

Machine
Machine